An embassy from the East-India Company of the United Provinces is a book written by Dutch author and explorer Johan Nieuhof. The book served as a major influence in the rise of chinoiserie in the early eighteenth century.

Full title 
The full title of the Dutch version of the travel account, published in 1665 by Jacob van Meurs was:

The English translation, published by John Ogilby in 1669, was titled:

An embassy from the East-India Company of the United Provinces, to the Grand Tartar Cham Emperor of China: deliver'd by their excellencies Peter de Goyer and Jacob de Keyzer, at his imperial city of Peking, wherein the cities, towns, villages, ports, rivers, &c. in their passages from Canton to Peking, are ingeniously describ'd also an epistle of Father John Adams their antagonist, concerning the whole negotiation; with an appendix of several remarks taken out of Father Athanasius Kircher; English'd, and set forth with their several sculptures.

These titles are abbreviated to Het Gezantschap (or Het Gezantschap aan den grooten Tartarische Cham) and An embassy from the East-India Company in later publications.

Context 
The book details the two year travel of the first Dutch embassy to visit China, from 1655 to 1657. The empire had begun accepting visitors after the start of the Qing dynasty, and the Dutch embassy visited with the goal of entering a trade deal on behalf of the Dutch East India Company (VOC). The Dutch were promised an audience with the Chinese emperor. As the embassy's steward, Nieuhof was tasked with keeping an account of the travels of the embassy. In addition to keeping the logbook for the journey, Nieuhof also drew several impressions of landscapes, cities, and people, which were to be used as a visual supplementation of the account for the VOC.

After returning from China, Nieuhof gifted his notes and illustrations to his brother Hendrik Nieuhof, who collaborated with the Dutch publisher and engraver Jacob van Meurs. Nieuhof left shortly thereafter, leaving the entire publication process in the hands of the publisher. Van Meurs turned Nieuhof's notes into a story, and the illustrations into copper engravings for printing. In 1665, almost ten years after the embassy visit to China, the first edition of Het Gezantschap in Dutch was published.

Despite its claim of being true to life, it has been indicated by Falkenburg and Blussé that this was not the case. The research of Falkenburg and Blussé compare the difference between the illustrations from An Embassy of the Dutch East-India Company Nieuhof's with Nieuhof's original sketches drawn during his time in China, which were rediscovered in the private collection of Roland Bonaparte in 1976 after being lost for four centuries. The published version of the travel account added illustrations (from 68 sketches in Nieuhof's notes to 149 illustrations in the published version) and changed sceneries to seem more exotic by adding exotic plants, pagodas and people with umbrella's. The written text was also edited, embellishing the travels.

Content 

The book consists of the notes and illustrations that Nieuhof made in his position as a steward on Peter de Goyer and Jacob de Keizer's embassy to the emperor of China. These notes and illustrations were left in the care of his brother Hendrik, "so as they not fall prey to rugged seas and hollow waves". This manuscript was eventually bundled and published to form this book, containing a written account of the embassy as well as 149 illustrations.

The book is split into two parts, the first of which details the journey of the embassy from Batavia to Beijing led by Peter de Goyer and Jacob de Keizer to the emperor of China. This part also contains descriptions and depictions of all that the embassy came to pass on its trip. This part contains 69 cityscapes drawn from the perspective of the ship, 20 detailed illustrations of architectural structures, and 9 illustrations of Chinese people and culture.

In addition to the illustrations, the first part provides a written account of the experiences of the Dutch in China, discussing their encounters with the Chinese and "Tartars", their experiences in the empire, and commercial interests such as trading, wages, and exotic merchandise.

The second part of the book serves as a general description of the empire of China. It provides information on the language, craftsmanship, culture, customs, fashion, religion and the natural world. The written account is supplemented with illustrations of the people, animals, and plants of China. This part contains 13 depictions of Chinese people from all classes, 13 etches of Chinese flora and fauna, depictions of Buddhist temples and deities, as well as several architectural structures.

In total, the account contains 149 illustrations, an unusually high number for 17th century books. Printing images was still far more expensive than written text, as it required copper etchings to be created and carefully printed in the books. Most travel accounts produced in this time would feature only a handful of images.

Publication history 
The book was first published by the Dutch publisher and engraver Jacob van Meurs in 1665. After its initial publication, the book was translated into multiple languages.

 French, published in 1665
 German, published in 1666
 Latin, published in 1668
 English, published in 1669

The French, German, and Latin versions of the book were all published by Van Meurs. These versions are not merely translated, their contents were heavily edited as well. Depending on the translation, the book focuses more heavily on certain aspects (for example religion), whilst leaving other parts out, depending on the culture and biases of the intended audiences. The publications were heavily edited, geared towards commercial interests of the publisher.

The English translation was the only one not published by Van Meurs, and was instead published by John Ogilby. This version also includes excerpts from Athanasius Kircher's China monumentis, a compiled work featuring knowledge available about China in 17th century Europe, as well as an epistle of John Adams, a British missionary in China.

Reception 

Travel literature had become a significant public interest in the 17th century. With the global trade enterprises, and the increase in knowledge of the non-western world, these works became a way for the people at home to feel like they were traveling the world. This was paired with an increase in literacy and a larger middle class, resulting from the economical flourishing of Western countries, and the printing of books becoming cheaper because of advancements in the technology of the printing press. For these reasons, as well as the novelty of the subject and the illustrations in the book, Het Gezantschap was very successful, and became one most popular travel books on China in the 17th century.

Within the genre of travel writing, Het Gezantschap was an especially sought-after book. With information on China being sparse because of its previous inaccessibility, Nieuhof's travel account provided information on a new culture and land. The book is generally considered the first visual account of China created by a Western authoritative figure. Prior accounts of China had been supplemented with visual reference material after the fact, and often featured mythological and fantastical creatures. Nieuhof's travel account claimed to be "na het leven" or true to life. Though this claim has been proven false, the sketches made by Nieuhof still featured elements drawn directly from observation.

After the publication of the book, Van Meurs went on to publish another book about China. Together with the author Olfert Dapper, he published Gedenkwaerdig bedryf der Nederlandsche Oost-Indische Maetschappye, op de kuste en in het Keizerrijk van Taising of Sina. The lithographies used to print the illustrations in An Embassy from the East-India Company were re-used in Dapper's account. A number of other works on China also re-used imagery from Nieuhof's travel account.

Two months after giving his notes to his brother Hendrik, Nieuhof left on another journey for the VOC. He traveled to the Dutch East Indies, on another diplomatic mission. After this, he remained most of his life abroad, in the East Indies, Ceylon, and Batavia. Nieuhof never visited China again in his life, but  two other books with his notes and sketches were published after his death. One about Brazil, where he had worked for 9 years before the embassy visit to China, and another about the Dutch East Indies.

Chinoiserie 
As it provided the first realistic visual representation of China, Nieuhof's travel account is considered one of the biggest influence on Western Chinoiserie. Depictions of China were copied from the book and incorporated in Delftware porcelain, tapestries, wallpapers and paintings. This artistic movement was especially famous in France and Great Britain, but had gained popularity all over Western-Europe.

Impressions copied from Het Gezantschap can be found on many Chinoiserie works from the 1660s onwards, with artists often combining multiple cityscapes, characters and scenes from different illustrations.

Bibliography
  Blussé, L. & R. Falkenburg (1987) Johan Nieuwhofs beelden van een Chinareis, 1655-1657. Middelburg.
 Sun, Jing (2013) The illusion of verisimilitude: Johan Nieuhof's images of China, PhD dissertation Leiden University pdf
 Ulrichs, F. (2003) Johan Nieuhofs Blick auf China (1655-1657). Die Kuperstiche in seinem Chinabuch und ihre Wirkung auf den Verleger Jacob van Meurs, Sinologica Coloniensia 21, Harrossowitz Verlag Wiesbaden.

References

See also
 External Links to copies of the book: On archive.org and on The Digital Library for the Decorative Arts and Material Culture
 List of works about the Dutch East India Company

1665 books
17th-century Dutch books
Books about China
Works about the Dutch East India Company